Villa General Mitre Airport was an airstrip  east of Villa del Totoral, a town in the Córdoba Province of Argentina.

Google Earth Historical Imagery (1/7/2002) shows the partial remains of a  grass runway. The (10/17/2010) image and current Google Maps show the land under cultivation.

See also

Transport in Argentina
List of airports in Argentina

References

External links 

Defunct airports
Airports in Argentina
Córdoba Province, Argentina